Zemplén was an administrative county (comitatus) of the Kingdom of Hungary. The northern part of its territory is now situated in eastern Slovakia (Zemplín region), while a smaller southern portion of the former county belongs to Hungary, as part of Borsod-Abaúj-Zemplén County.

Geography

Zemplén county shared borders with Poland (during some periods the with the Austrian crownland Galicia) and the Hungarian counties Sáros, Abaúj-Torna, Borsod, Szabolcs and Ung. It was situated in the easternmost strip of what is now Slovakia (except for the region between Vihorlatské vrchy and the Latorica river), plus a strip along the Bodrog and Tisza rivers in present-day Hungary. The rivers Laborc and Bodrog flowed through the county. Its area was 6,269 km² around 1910.

Capitals
Initially, the capital of the county was the Zemplín Castle (Hungarian: Zempléni vár, Slovak: Zemplínsky hrad), in the 13th century also Sárospatak (in Slovak: Potok, hence the alternative name of the county comitatus de Potok). Since the Late Middle Ages the capital was the town of Zemplén, and since 1748 was Sátoraljaújhely (which is now divided between Slovakia and Hungary by the Ronyva/Roňava stream; the Hungarian part is known in Slovak as Nové Mesto pod Šiatrom and the Slovak part is now a separate village called Slovenské Nové Mesto).

History
Zemplén was one of the oldest counties of the Kingdom of Hungary. In the aftermath of World War I, in 1920 by the Treaty of Trianon the northern part of Zemplén county became part of newly formed Czechoslovakia. The southern half (including the bigger part of the divided Sátoraljaújhely) stayed in Hungary as the county of Zemplén. Following the provisions of the First Vienna Award, an additional part became part of Hungary again in November 1938. The Trianon borders were restored after World War II, and the Hungarian county Zemplén merged with Abaúj, the most of Borsod-Gömör and a little part of Szabolcs counties to form the present Borsod-Abaúj-Zemplén County.

Demographics

Subdivisions

In the early 20th century, the subdivisions of Zemplén county were:

The towns of Sátoraljaújhely, Sárospatak, Tokaj and Szerencs are now in Hungary, except for a small northern part (about a quarter) of Sátoraljaújhely to the northeast of the Ronyva (Rožňava) stream in Slovakia, now a small village with its own artificial Slovak name Slovenské Nové Mesto.

Notable people
 
 
Demetrius Futaki (d. 1372), born at Mézes in Zemplén county

Notes

References

States and territories disestablished in 1920
States and territories disestablished in 1950
Counties in the Kingdom of Hungary
Divided regions